intalliance AG was a German corporation based in Hanover which operated the Hanover S-Bahn and Hanover Stadtbahn. It ceased to exist on January 1, 2007. After splitting up the Hanover S-Bahn is now operated again by DB Regio and the Hanover Stadtbahn by üstra Hannoversche Verkehrsbetriebe AG.

The corporation was owned by üstra Hannoversche Verkehrsbetriebe AG and DB Stadtverkehr with 40% each. The remaining 20% were held by NORD/LB. The üstra and DB Regio, who held the licences issued by the state of Lower Saxony to provide traffic services, had outsourced these services to intalliance. 1900 üstra employees and 285 DB Regio employees were transferred over to intalliance.

The intalliance AG owned 318 Stadtbahn vehicles, 138 buses and 46 S-Bahn trainsets.

See also 
Hanover Stadtbahn
Hanover S-Bahn

External links 
intalliance.de

Transport in Hanover
Transport operators of Germany
Companies based in Hanover
German companies disestablished in 2007